Faruk Khan (born 18 September 1951) is a Bangladeshi politician and former Minister of Civil Aviation and Tourism of Bangladesh Government. Khan is a parliament member for five consecutive times from Gopalganj-1 and former Commerce & Industry Secretary of the Awami League.

Early life
Khan was born on 18 September 1951 in Dhaka to his parents Serajul Karim Khan and mother Khaleda Karim Khan. He holds a Masters in Defense Studies from Defense Services and Staff College in Mirpur.

Career 
Khan was commissioned from 44 Pakistan Military Academy long course in the corps of infantry on 26 March 1971. He retired as a Lieutenant Colonel on 15 May 1995 from Bangladesh Army.

Khan was parliament member. He also held cabinet portfolio of Civil Aviation and Tourism, and Commerce. He was elected from the seat of Gopalganj-1 with 99% votes the third time in a row at 29 December 2008's National Election. Khan pledged that the reduction of prices of basic foods and commodities are a priority in his term.

Personal life
Khan is married to Nilufer Faruk Khan, a social worker. Together they have two daughters Qantara K Khan and Qareena K Khan. His father, Sirajul Karim Khan, was an army officer and mother was Khaleda Karim Khan.

See also
 2008 Bangladesh general election

References

External links
Faruk Khan dot Com
News dot Faruk Khan dot Com
Commerce Minister Muhammad Faruk Khan - Google News

Living people
1951 births
Awami League politicians
8th Jatiya Sangsad members
Bangladesh Army colonels
Civil Aviation and Tourism ministers of Bangladesh
11th Jatiya Sangsad members
7th Jatiya Sangsad members
9th Jatiya Sangsad members
10th Jatiya Sangsad members
People from Gopalganj District, Bangladesh